Nicholas Quinn (born 3 June 1993) is an Irish swimmer. He competed in the men's 100 metre breaststroke event at the 2016 Summer Olympics. He also competed in the Men's 200 metre breaststroke finishing in 19th place.

References

External links
 

1993 births
Living people
Irish male swimmers
Olympic swimmers of Ireland
Swimmers at the 2016 Summer Olympics
People from Castlebar
People educated at St Gerald's College, Castlebar
Male breaststroke swimmers
20th-century Irish people
21st-century Irish people